Robert Roy Lorimer (born August 25, 1953) is a Canadian former ice hockey defenceman.

Born in Toronto, Ontario, Lorimer started his National Hockey League career with the New York Islanders in 1976. He also played for the Colorado Rockies and New Jersey Devils. He retired after the 1986 season. He won the Stanley Cup twice with New York, in 1980 and 1981.

Career statistics

Regular season and playoffs

Awards and honors

References

External links
 

1953 births
Living people
Canadian ice hockey defencemen
Colorado Rockies (NHL) players
Fort Worth Texans players
Michigan Tech Huskies men's ice hockey players
Muskegon Mohawks players
NCAA men's ice hockey national champions
New Jersey Devils players
New York Islanders draft picks
New York Islanders players
Oklahoma City Blazers (1965–1977) players
Ice hockey people from Toronto
Stanley Cup champions